The 2016–17 Liga Femenina de Baloncesto is the 54th edition of the Spanish premier women's basketball championship. Regular season will start on 28 September 2016 and will finish on 1 April 2017. Playoffs will be played between 5 April and 3 May 2017.

Competition format 

All the 14 teams play the regular season, consisted in a home and away round-robin. At the end of the regular season, the four first teams qualify for the playoffs, on a best of three series. The two last qualified teams are relegated to Liga Femenina 2.

At the end of the regular season, the two first teams will directly qualify to semifinals, while teams between third and sixth join the quarterfinals stage.

The two last qualified teams will be relegated to Liga Femenina 2.

Copa de la Reina
For the Copa de la Reina, initially was confirmed a format similar to the previous years, the first three qualified teams at the end of the first half of the season and another one qualified as host would play the Cup in a Final Four format, to be played on 11 and 12 February 2017.

However, on 15 November 2016, the Spanish Basketball Federation expanded the competition to the first six qualified teams at the half of the season. The two best teams will qualify directly to the semifinals while the other four teams will join the competition in the round of quarterfinals.

Participating clubs 
At the end of the 2015–16 season, Spar Gran Canaria and Añares Rioja ISB were relegated to Liga Femenina 2. Likewise, Lacturale Araski and Al-Qázeres Extremadura promoted from this league as champion and runner-up respectively.

As Conquero Huelva Wagen finally was not admitted in the league, the Spanish Basketball Federation invited Spar Gran Canaria to occupy its place.

Regular season

League table

Positions by round
The table lists the positions of teams after completion of each round.

Playoffs

Quarterfinals

(4) Star Center–Uni Ferrol vs. (5) IDK Gipuzkoa

(3) Lointek Gernika Bizkaia vs. (6) Lacturale Araski

Semifinals

(1) Perfumerías Avenida vs. (4) Star Center–Uni Ferrol

(2) Spar CityLift Girona vs. (6) Lacturale Araski

Final

(1) Perfumerías Avenida vs. (2) Spar CityLift Girona

Stats leaders in regular season

Points

Rebounds

Assists

Performance Index Rating

References

External links
Official league website
2016–17 Liga Femenina 2 rulebook
Spanish Basketball Federation website

Spain
Fem
Liga Femenina de Baloncesto seasons
Liga